The following highways are numbered 400:

Australia
 Murray Valley Highway

Canada
 Ontario Highway 400

Croatia
 D400 road

Ireland
 R400 road

Japan
 Japan National Route 400

Korea, South
 Capital Region Second Ring Expressway

South Africa
 R400 road in the Eastern Cape

Spain
 N-400 road

Turkey 
 , a west-east state road in Turkey running from Datça, Muğla Province to Esendere at the Iranian border.

United Kingdom
 A400 road in London
B400 road (Chancery Lane)

United States
  U.S. Route 400
  Arkansas Highway 400
  Florida State Road 400
  Georgia State Route 400
  Kentucky Route 400
  Louisiana Highway 400
  Maryland Route 400, a former state highway
  Nevada State Route 400
 New York:
  New York State Route 400
  County Route 400 (Erie County, New York)
  North Carolina Highway 400
 Pennsylvania Route 400 (official designation for Pennsylvania Route 380)
  Puerto Rico Highway 400
  South Carolina Highway 400 
  Tennessee State Route 400
 Texas:
  Texas State Highway Spur 400
  Farm to Market Road 400
 Utah:
 Road 400 (Cottonwood Canyon Road)
  Virginia State Route 400
 Virginia State Route 400 (former)